Apostolou is a Greek surname. It is the surname of:
 Evangelos Apostolou (born 1949), Greek politician and government minister
 Georgia Apostolou (born 1966), Greek actress
 Ilektra Apostolou (1912–1944), Greek feminist and member of the Greek resistance
 Jenny Apostolou, Greek-Australian actress

Greek-language surnames
Surnames
Patronymic surnames